= Campaign Promises =

1988 simulation video game

- Publisher: Front Runner Software Company
- Platform: MS-DOS
- Release: 1988
- Genre: Simulation

Campaign Promises is a political simulation video game published in 1988 for MS-DOS by Front Runner Software Company.

== Gameplay ==
Campaign Promises is a game in which each player chooses three campaign promises representing special interests in the presidential election.

== Reception ==
Wyatt Lee reviewed the game for Computer Gaming World, and stated that "All in all, Campaign Promises is fast enough to be a good family game; offers enough strategy to intrigue the thinking gamer; provides enough luck to attract the casual gamer; teaches enough valid lessons to make citizens think at election time; and is entertaining enough to make one play it over and over. If one does not want too cerebral a game, but is interested in politics, Campaign Promises has a lot to offer."
